The Battle of Bašina Brdo (Croatian: Bitka na Bašinom Brdu) was one of the shortest battles in the Croat–Bosniak War. The battle centered around the small mountain of Bašina Brdo (1,130 m).

Prelude 
Since January 1993, Croats in the Lepenica and Lašva valleys, were separated by RBiH forces.Months-long Bosniak resistance against the Croat Central Bosnia offensive, led the HVO to embark on a "crucial struggle for the survival of the Croatian dream of Greater Croatia". Croatia was unable to help the surrounded Croats due to constant Bosniak resistance. Despite being cut off, Croat authorities in Lašva Valley were previously able to carry out war crimes.

Battle 
On 12 November 1993, the HVO started attacking ARBiH positions and marked the beginning of a major upheaval on the battlefield. The Bosniak forces' morale gradually depleted and eventually the HVO occupied Bosnian towns such as Gojevići and Bakovići. 

The HVO, however, failed to capture nearby Fojnica even following the ARBiH's (temporary) withdrawal from the city due to an "unfavorable political climate" and international pressure.

Aftermath

War crimes 
On November 13 1993, just a day after the battle, Croats claimed that ARBiH forces killed 2 catholic priests (Vicar Fr. Nikica Miličević and Fr. Leon Migić) of the Franciscan friary of Fojnica, as well as burning 2 elderly woman in the village of Šćitovo. HVO accused Miralem Čengić as one of the perpetrators, but he was pardoned after the verdict. The alleged perpetrators were never punished.

References 



Battles of the Bosnian War
1993 in Bosnia and Herzegovina
Army of the Republic of Bosnia and Herzegovina
Croatian Defence Council
Bosnian mujahideen
November 1993 events in Europe